Abdullah Malallah Salem Bo Sumait (born 5 July 1983) is an retired Emirati footballer.

External links
 Abdullah Profile at Al Ain Fc.net Official Site
  Abdullah Statistics at Goalzz.com

Emirati footballers
Al Ain FC players
Fujairah FC players
Al-Wasl F.C. players
Emirates Club players
Ajman Club players
Dubai CSC players
1983 births
Living people
UAE First Division League players
UAE Pro League players
Association football midfielders